First-seeded William Bowrey won in the final 7–5, 2–6, 9–7, 6–4 against Juan Gisbert Sr. to win the men's singles tennis title at the 1968 Australian Championships. Roy Emerson was the defending champion but did not compete that year.

Seeds
A champion seed is indicated in bold text while text in italics indicates the round in which that seed was eliminated. The joint first seeds received a bye to the second round.

  William Bowrey (champion) /  Juan Gisbert Sr. (final)
 n/a
  Ray Ruffels (semifinals) /  Manuel Orantes (quarterfinals)
 n/a
  Graham Stilwell (second round) /  Barry Phillips-Moore (semifinals)
 n/a
  Dick Crealy (quarterfinals) /  Mike Belkin (quarterfinals)
 n/a
  Peter Curtis (first round) /  Allan Stone (third round)
 n/a
  Sutarjo Sugiarto (second round) / n/a
 n/a
  Phil Dent (quarterfinals) /  Gondo Widjojo (first round)
 n/a
  Ray Keldie (third round) /  Jun Kamiwazumi (second round)
 n/a

Draw

Finals

Main draw

Section 1

Section 2

Section 3

Section 4

External links
 1968 Australian Championships – Men's draws and results at the International Tennis Federation
 Association of Tennis Professionals (ATP) – 1968 Australian Championships Men's Singles draw

1968
1968 in Australian tennis
Men's Singles